Pokrovka, Azerbaijan may refer to:
Pokrovka, Jalilabad, Azerbaijan
Pokrovka, Sabirabad, Azerbaijan